The Roman Catholic Diocese of Skálholt has been a titular see of the Catholic Church since 1968. It was the estate of the first bishop in Iceland, Isleifr Gizurarson, who became bishop in 1056. Christianity had been formally adopted in 1000. His son, Gizurr, donated it to become the official see of the Diocese. It ceased its functions as a Roman Catholic diocese with the Reformation.

Roman Catholic bishops 
 1056–1080: Ísleifur Gissurarson
 1082–1118: Gissur Ísleifsson
 1118–1133: Þorlákur Runólfsson
 1134–1148: Magnús Einarsson
 1152–1176: Klængur Þorsteinsson
 1178–1193: St. Þorlákur helgi Þórhallsson
 1195–1211: Páll Jónsson
 1216–1237: Magnús Gissurarson
 1238–1268: Sigvarður Þéttmarsson (Norwegian)
 1269–1298: Árni Þorláksson
 1304–1320: Árni Helgason
 1321–1321: Grímur Skútuson (Norwegian)
 1322–1339: Jón Halldórsson (Norwegian)
 1339–1341: Jón Indriðason (Norwegian)
 1343–1348: Jón Sigurðsson
 1350–1360: Gyrðir Ívarsson (Norwegian)
 1362–1364: Þórarinn Sigurðsson (Norwegian)
 1365–1381: Oddgeir Þorsteinsson (Norwegian)
 1382–1391: Mikael (Danish)
 1391–1405: Vilchin Hinriksson (Danish)
 1406–1413: Jón (Norwegian)
 1413–1426: Árni Ólafsson
 1426–1433: Jón Gerreksson (Danish)
 1435–1437: Jón Vilhjálmsson Craxton (English)
 1437–1447: Gozewijn Comhaer (Dutch)
 1448–1462: Marcellus de Niveriis (German)
 1462–1465: Jón Stefánsson Krabbe (Danish)
 1466–1475: Sveinn spaki Pétursson
 1477–1490: Magnús Eyjólfsson
 1491–1518: Stefán Jónsson
 1521–1540: Ögmundur Pálsson

Titular see 
In 1968, the former Catholic bishopric was revived as a titular see. Holders of the title have been:
 Archbishop Jan Baptist Hubert Theunissen, S.M.M. (19 December 1968 – 9 April 1979; former Archbishop of Blantyre, Malawi)
 Bishop Alphonsus Maria H.A. Castermans (15 January 1982 – 21 April 2008), Auxiliary Bishop of Roermond, Netherlands, from 1982 to 1997
 Bishop Paul Mason (23 April 2016 – 9 July 2019), Auxiliary Bishop of Southwark (UK), appointed Bishop of the Military Ordinariate of the UK
 Archbishop Antoine Camilleri (4 October 2019 – present), Apostolic Nuncio

Notes

References

Additional sources
  
 Gunnar Kristjánsson et al., eds, Saga biskupsstólanna: Skálholt 950 ára 2006, Hólar 900 ára (Akureyri: Hólar, 2006), pp. 854–55.

External links
 GigaCatholic, with residential and titular incumbent lists, linking to biographies

History of Christianity in Iceland
Skálholt
Bishops in Iceland
Catholic titular sees in Europe